The 2005–06 season was AS Monaco FC's 49th season in Ligue 1. They finished tenth in Ligue 1, and were knocked out of the Coupe de la Ligue by Nice, in the semifinals, and the Coupe de France by Colmar at the Last 32. Monaco started the season under the management of Didier Deschamps, but after a poor start and disagreement with the club's President, Michel Pastor, Deschamps resigned from the club on 19 September 2005. Jean Petit was appointed as coach follow Deschamps' departure with Francesco Guidolin taking over from him in October.

Squad

Out on loan

Transfers

Summer

In:

Out:

Winter

In:

Out:

Competitions

Ligue 1

League table

Results summary

Results by round

Results

Coupe de la Ligue

Coupe de France

UEFA Champions League

Qualifying rounds

Third qualifying round

UEFA Cup

First round

Group stage

Knockout stage

Round of 32

Statistics

Appearances and Goals

|-
|colspan="14"|Players away from the club on loan:

|-
|colspan="14"|Players who appeared for Monaco no longer at the club:

|}

Goal scorers

Disciplinary Record

References

Monaco
AS Monaco FC seasons
AS Monaco
AS Monaco